Nowra High School is a government-funded co-educational comprehensive secondary day school, located in , in the South Coast region of New South Wales, Australia.

Established in 1956, the school enrolled approximately 910 students in 2018, from Year 7 to Year 12, of whom eleven percent identified as Indigenous Australians and seven percent were from a language background other than English. The school is operated by the NSW Department of Education; the principal is Glen Kingsley. The school motto is "Wisdom Through Knowledge".

Overview 
On 17 May 2007 the Governor-General hosted a meeting in the school with indigenous students from the city's high schools.

Notable alumni
  Anna Bligh a former politician and Premier of Queensland who spent the last six months of her schooling at Nowra High
 Fiona Phillips, federal MP

Notable former staff
 Brian McGowana teacher during the 1960s; and a former member of the NSW Legislative Assembly

See also 

 List of government schools in New South Wales
 List of schools in Illawarra and the South East (New South Wales)
 Education in Australia

References

External links

 

Public high schools in New South Wales
1956 establishments in Australia
Educational institutions established in 1956
Nowra, New South Wales